Aglaomorpha histrio is a moth of the family Erebidae first described by Francis Walker in 1855. It is found in Korea, Japan, China and Taiwan.

The wingspan is 72–94 mm.

Subspecies
Aglaomorpha histrio histrio (Japan, China: Shanghai, Zhejiang, Jiangsu, Fujian, Jiangsi, Hunan, Hubei, Sichuan, Yunnan)
Aglaomorpha histrio coreana (Matsumura, 1927) (Korea)
Aglaomorpha histrio formosana (Miyake, 1907) (Taiwan)

References

Moths described in 1855
Callimorphina
Moths of Asia